Bloodred Massacre is the fourth studio album by the German death metal band Fleshcrawl. It is their first release to feature vocalist Sven Gross, who performed with the band until his death in 2021.

This album, although somewhat different from the previous Fleshcrawl releases, is highly archetypal of the band's general 1990s sound. It is more rhythmic than its predecessors, helping to fortify the band's stake in the melodic death metal genre, and is strongly characterized by agile and smooth, yet sometimes dramatic, patterning transitions, medium-to-high tempo cyclic riffs that sometimes resemble speed metal, baritonic death growls, and rapid double bass drum rolls, typical of death metal. The general themes of the album remain consistent with earlier releases and cover such concepts as violent death, hell-born rebirth ("Hellspawn"), misanthropy ("Bloodred Massacre"), deception ("The Messenger"), and eternal damnation ("Through the Veil of Dawn").

Track listing 
 "Hellspawn" – 3:51
 "Dark Dimension" – 4:39
 "Bloodred Massacre" – 3:43
 "Awaiting the End" – 5:21
 "The Messenger" – 3:04
 "Through the Veil of Dawn" – 2:58
 "Necrophiliac" (Slayer cover) – 3:41
 "Beyond Belief" – 5:08
 "Slaughter at Dawn" – 1:30

Personnel 

 Sven Gross – vocals
 Mike Hanus –  guitar, bass
 Stefan Hanus – guitar
 Bastian Herzog – drums

Production 

 Produced by Fleshcrawl & Peter Tägtgren
 Recorded and mixed at The Abyss studio, Grangärde-Pärlby, Sweden, 11–23 August 1997
 Engineered by Peter Tägtgren and Mikael Hedlund
 Mixed by Fleshcrawl & Peter Tägtgren
 Mastered by Peter in de Betou at Cuttingroom, Solna, Sweden
 All music and lyrics by Fleshcrawl, except "Necrophiliac", originally by Slayer (Hanneman/King)
 Cover artwork by Juha Vuorma
 Layout by Stefan & Mike Hanus. Graphic work by Stefan Hanus (Orca Graphics).

External links 
 Fleshcrawl's official homepage

1997 albums
Fleshcrawl albums
Albums produced by Peter Tägtgren